Pallavolo Molfetta is a professional volleyball team based in Molfetta, Italy.

History
In 2012 the club was promoted to Serie A1, highest level of the Italian Volleyball League. Same year Argentine Juan Manuel Cichello was a new head coach. In November 2016 Flavio Gulineli was a new head coach.

Team

References

External links
 LegaVolley squad

Italian volleyball clubs
Volleyball clubs established in 1964
1964 establishments in Italy